This is a list of official football games played by Syria national football team between 2010 and 2019.

2010

2011

2012

2013

2014

2015

2016

2017

2018

2019

Statistics

Results by year

Opponents

Notes

References

External links 
 Syria national football team

2010
2010s in Syrian sport